Elizabeth is a Venezuelan telenovela written by Pilar Romero and produced by Radio Caracas Televisión in 1981. This telenovela lasted 67 episodes and was distributed internationally by Coral International. The main theme for the telenovela was Ayúdala performed by Mari Trini.

Caridad Canelón and Orlando Urdaneta starred as the main protagonists.

Synopsis
During a school event, Elizabeth and her cousin who is also her best friend Lourdes flee in fear after chaos erupts, and both of them suffer from identical dizziness. Juan David, a journalist covering the event, takes them home. Although he has a girlfriend, Juan David becomes interested in Elizabeth. The two cousins continue suffering from dizziness until Lourdes discovers she is pregnant from a man she knows her mother would ever accept, and so she decides to get an abortion. But in Elizabeth's case, she is diagnosed with a fatal disease:leukemia, and her only hope becomes a bone marrow transfer from a close relative.

It is through this situation that Elizabeth's parents confirm that she is adopted, and they begin the frantic search for her biological mother Graciela who was forced to give her up. Graciela who is now a famous journalist donates her bone marrow, but the transplant fails. She is forced to look for Elizabeth's biological father, a scoundrel who only agrees to do the surgery in exchange for money. Meanwhile, Lourdes convinces her mother to accept her marriage to the father of her baby.

Finally cured, Elizabeth marries Juan David. But a pregnancy places her life in danger. In the end she dies after giving birth to a daughter. Juan David raises his daughter while lovingly remembering his beloved Elizabeth.

Cast
Caridad Canelón as Elizabeth
Orlando Urdaneta as Juan David
Grecia Colmenares as Lourdes
Carmen Julia Alvarez as Graciela
Hilda Vera as Jimena
Javier Vidal as José Antonio
Yanis Chimaras as Aníbal
Laura Brey as Melania

Remake
In 2007, RCTV remade the telenovela Elizabeth under a new title Mi prima Ciela starring Mónica Spear and Manuel Sosa.

References

External links
Elizabeth at the Internet Movie Database

1981 telenovelas
RCTV telenovelas
Venezuelan telenovelas
1981 Venezuelan television series debuts
1981 Venezuelan television series endings
Spanish-language telenovelas
Television shows set in Venezuela